The David and Elaine Spitz Prize is an award for a book in liberal and/or democratic theory.

The Spitz Prize is awarded annually for the best book in the field published two years earlier. To be eligible, the book must be primarily theoretical rather than historical, and not a textbook or edited work. The prize is awarded by a panel of political scholars under the auspices of the International Conference for the Study of Political Thought (CSPT), "an international, interdisciplinary organization of scholars and informed citizens interested in preserving and encouraging a broad, humanistic style of thinking about politics."

Winners of the David and Elaine Spitz Prize:

1988 – Joseph Raz for The Morality of Freedom
1989 – Richard E. Flathman  for The Philosophy and Politics of Freedom
1990 – no award given
1991 – Robert A. Dahl for Democracy and Its Critics
1992 – Charles W. Anderson for Pragmatic Liberalism
1993 – William Galston for Liberal Purposes: Goods, Virtues, and Diversity in the Liberal State
1994 – George Kateb for The Inner Ocean: Individualism and Democratic
1995 – John Rawls for Political Liberalism
1996 – William E. Scheuerman for Between the Norm and the Exception: The Frankfurt School and the Rule of Law
1997 – Mark Kingwell for A Civil Tongue: Justice, Dialogue, and the Politics of Pluralism 
1998 – John Dryzek for Democracy in Capitalist Times: Ideals, Limits, and Struggles 
1999 – Richard Dagger for Civic Virtues: Rights, Citizenship, and Republican Liberalism
2000 – no award given
2001 – Thomas A. Spragens, Jr. for Civic Liberalism: Reflections on Our Democratic Ideals 
2002 – no award given
2003 – Mark E. Warren for Democracy and Association
2004 – Nadia Urbinati for Mill on Democracy: From the Athenian Polis to Representative Government
2005 – Ira Katznelson for Desolation and Enlightenment: Political Knowledge After Total War, Totalitarianism, and the Holocaust
2006 – Sheldon S. Wolin for Politics and Vision: Continuity and Innovation in Western Political Thought 
2007 – George Klosko for Political Obligations
2008 – Martha Nussbaum for Frontiers of Justice: Disability, Nationality, Species Membership
2009 – Richard Bellamy for Political Constitutionalism: a Republican Defence of the Constitutionality of Democracy
2010 – Sharon Krause for Civil Passions: Moral Sentiment and Democratic Deliberation
2011 – Murray Milgate and Shannon C. Stimson for After Adam Smith: A Century of Transformation in Politics and Political Economy
2012 – Paul Weithman for Why Political Liberalism?: On John Rawls's Political Turn
2013 – John P. McCormick for Machiavellian Democracy
2014 – Philip Pettit for On The People's Terms: A Republican Theory and Model of Democracy
2015 – Hélène Landemore for Democratic Reason: Politics, Collective Intelligence, and the Rule of the Many
2016 – Melissa Schwartzberg for Counting the Many: The Origins and Limits of Supermajority Rule
2017 – Wendy Brown for Undoing the Demos: Neoliberalism's Stealth Revolution
2018 – Tommie Shelby for Dark Ghettos: Injustice, Dissent, and Reform
2019 – Cécile Laborde for Liberalism's Religion

References

External links

Spitz Prize home page

American literary awards
Political science awards
Awards established in 1988
1988 establishments in the United States